Everything, Everything is a 2017 American romantic drama film directed by Stella Meghie and written by J. Mills Goodloe, based on Nicola Yoon’s 2015 novel of the same name. The film was produced by Elysa Dutton and Leslie Morgenstein and stars Amandla Stenberg and Nick Robinson and follows a young woman named Maddy Whittier (Stenberg) who has a serious medical condition that prevents her from leaving her home, and her neighbor Olly Bright (Robinson), who wants to help her experience life and they begin falling in love.

Principal photography began on September 6, 2016 in Vancouver, British Columbia, and wrapped up the next month on October 7, 2016.

The film was released on May 19, 2017, by Warner Bros. Pictures. It received mixed reviews from critics, with praise directed at the two lead performances, but with heavy criticism aimed at the screenplay. Nevertheless, it was a commercial success, grossing $61 million worldwide on a production budget of $10 million.

Plot 
Eighteen-year-old Maddy (Amandla Stenberg) is being treated for the immune disorder SCID by her mother, Pauline Whittier. Her nurse Carla has helped take care of Maddy for 15 years.

Pauline monitors her daughter's health status constantly and provides daily medication. Only she, Carla and Carla's daughter, Rosa, are allowed in the home. Maddy is not allowed to leave the house or interact with anyone or anything that has not been "sanitized." She yearns to see the world, especially the ocean.

One day, a new family moves next door, and their son (Nick Robinson), who is Maddy's age, catches her eye. Later that night, while she and Pauline are watching a movie, the boy and his sister appear on their doorstep, offering a bundt cake.

Pauline politely rejects it, and as she is closing the door, the boy asks where her daughter is. She lies, telling him Maddy is not home. As Pauline sees Maddy's desire to get to know the boy, she tries to block off all opportunities for her to contact him. It is also revealed that his father is violent and their relationship is strained.

Later, the boy writes his number on his window for Maddy and soon they begin communicating through text. He introduces himself as Olly, and they text for a while, getting to know each other and eventually growing very fond of each other.

Knowing her mother would not approve, Maddy convinces Carla to secretly let Olly visit her inside the house, though Carla makes them promise to stay on different sides of the room from each other. She later invites Olly over on the Fourth of July, as her mother is working that day. Maddy and Olly share a passionate kiss as fireworks go off outside.

The next day, Maddy sees Olly fighting with his father outside. When his father shoves him to the ground, she, to her mother's shock, rushes outside to comfort Olly. Deducing that Maddy and Olly have been seeing each other, she forbids their relationship and later fires Carla for betraying her trust.

Maddy decides it is time to take matters into her own hands. With a credit card she had previously opened online, she buys two tickets to Hawaii, and convinces Olly to go there with her. On the way to the airport, Olly calls his sister, Kayra, telling her he is going to Hawaii with Maddy for a couple of days and to take care of their mother.

In Hawaii, they share a romantic and life-changing experience. Pauline sends a police car to find Maddy, and when she spots Kayra walking by the house she asks if she knows where her brother and Maddy are, but she denies it.

During the trip, Maddy passes out and Olly rushes her to the hospital and she wakes up back in bed at home. She breaks off contact with Olly as she does not want to make another mistake over love again. She is therefore unable to say goodbye when his mother finally decides to leave his father, taking Olly and his sister back to New York with her.

A doctor from the hospital in Hawaii calls Maddy to give her an update, telling her she does not have something as severe as SCID. Scouring her mother's records, she cannot find anything indicating she had ever been diagnosed with the disorder. Realizing her mother has been lying to her for her whole life, Maddy runs away from home.
 
Maddy stays with Carla and Rosa. A doctor confirms she has never had SCID, just an underdeveloped immune system from under-exposure due to living in filtered air her whole life. Her mother later tells her that after Maddy's father and brother died in a car crash, Maddy was all she had left and she wanted to protect keep her safe. Giving Maddy a bag of her things, she leaves.

Later Maddy reunites with Olly in NYC, where they restart their romance.

Cast 
 Amandla Stenberg as Madeline "Maddy" Whittier
 Nick Robinson as Oliver "Olly" Bright
 Anika Noni Rose as Dr. Pauline Whittier, Maddy's mother
 Ana de la Reguera as Carla, Maddy's nurse
 Taylor Hickson as Kayra Bright, Olly's younger sister

Production 
Principal photography on the film began on September 6, 2016, in Vancouver, British Columbia.

Music

Soundtrack

Credits adapted from Tidal.

Track listing

Release 
Everything, Everything was released on May 19, 2017 by Warner Bros. Pictures and Metro-Goldwyn-Mayer Pictures. It was originally scheduled for August 18, 2017, but was moved up to its May date.

Box office
Everything, Everything grossed $34.1 million in the United States and Canada and $27.5 million in other countries, for a worldwide total of $61.6 million, against a production budget of $10 million.

In North America, the film was released alongside Alien: Covenant and Diary of a Wimpy Kid: The Long Haul, and was projected to gross $10–12 million from 2,801 theaters during its opening weekend. It made $525,000 from Thursday night previews and $4.7 million on its first day. It went on to open to $11.7 million, finishing 3rd at the box office.

Critical response
On Rotten Tomatoes, the film has an approval rating of 45% based on 123 reviews, with an average rating of 5.30/10. The website's critical consensus reads, "Everything, Everything should tug young adult heartstrings fairly effectively, but may not be quite engrossing enough to woo less melodramatically inclined viewers." On Metacritic, the film has a score of 52 out of 100, based on 26 critics, indicating "mixed or average reviews". Audiences polled by CinemaScore gave the film an average grade of "A−" on an A+ to F scale.

The Immune Deficiency Foundation criticized the film as "erroneously misrepresenting [SCID] through worn stereotypes and misinformation," singling out in particular the film's use of Munchhausen-by-proxy as damaging to patients who actually have SCID.

See also 
 The Boy in the Plastic Bubble

References

External links 
 
 

2017 romantic drama films
2010s teen drama films
2010s teen romance films
Alloy Entertainment films
American romantic drama films
American teen drama films
American teen romance films
Films about diseases
Films about interracial romance
Films based on American novels
Films based on young adult literature
Films scored by Ludwig Göransson
Films set in Los Angeles
Films shot in Mexico
Films shot in Vancouver
Metro-Goldwyn-Mayer films
Warner Bros. films
Films directed by Stella Meghie
2010s English-language films
2010s American films
African-American films